Michael Wilson (27 March 1940 – 3 December 2015) was a New Zealand cricketer. He played one first-class match for Central Districts in 1959/60.

References

External links
 

1940 births
2015 deaths
New Zealand cricketers
Central Districts cricketers
Cricketers from Blenheim, New Zealand